Tork-e Gharbi Rural District is a rural district (dehestan) in Jowkar District, Malayer County, Hamadan Province, Iran. At the 2006 census, its population was 12,367, in 2,832 families. The rural district has 19 villages.

References 

Rural Districts of Hamadan Province
Malayer County